Mom Luang Dej Snidvongs (18 February 1898 – 8 September 1975) was a Thai honorary academic. He was the President of the Privy Council of Thailand to King Bhumibol Adulyadej and Governor of the Bank of Thailand in 1949 to 1952. He was given the title of Luang Dejsahakorn.

Family and education 
Mom Luang Dej Sanitwong is the third son of  Chaopraya Wongsanaprapat (Mom Rajawongse Sathand Snidvongs) and Thanpuying Wongsanuprapat (Tat Singhaseni). He was born at the palace of Prince Sai Sanidvongs at Pom Prap Sattru Phai District, Phra Nakhon Province on 18 February 1898. He has 14 half-brother and sister, one of whom was Bua Snidvongs, the sister of different mothers which is the mother of Queen Sirikit, Therefore, Dej Snidvongswas was an uncle of Queen Sirikit.

He began to study at Praya Singhaseni's wife house, Khunying Hong who was his aunt. Later in 1906, he attended the Debsirin School. Later, he moved to King's College under the Ministry of Justice at Bang Khwang Sub-district, Nonthaburi Province. In 1914 he received government scholarships to study in Germany. Subsequently, World War I occurred on 4 August 1914 when the Thai government declared war on Germany on 22 July 1917 he was arrested by German government with 4 Thai students, namely Tua Lapanukrom, Term Bunnag, Prachuap Bunnag and Mom Luang Udom Snidvongs. Later in 1918 has a revolution in Germany Thai captive students were released. Therefore, joined the Siamese Expeditionary Forces together with the Allies invading Germany. After the end of the war, he moved to study in Bern, Switzerland in 1919 and was able to take the entrance examination at the University of Bern in the year 1920 and graduated with a Doktorrerum Politicarum (Cum Laude) degree in 1925. After that, he traveled to study and research the history of economics and trade between Thailand and the United Kingdom 6 months before returning to Thailand in 1926.

Dej Snidvongs married with Prayong Snidvongs na Ayudhya in 1928. There are 4 children, Warunyapha Snidvongs na Ayudhya, Phisit Snidvongs na Ayudhya, Manu-seri Snidvongs na Ayudhya and Kasem Snidvongs na Ayudhya. He died with lung cancer at Chulalongkorn Hospital on 8 September 1975 at 22.33 hrs at the age of 77 years old.

Careers 
Dej Snidvongs started the first government service in 1926 as the commissioner of the Department of Commerce's, Minister of Economic Affairs. In 1935 he was the Permanent Secretary of the Ministry of Agriculture and then in 1942 as Permanent Secretary of the Ministry of Economy and acting in the position of Permanent Secretary of the Ministry of Commerce in the same year. In 1949 he was the Governor of the Bank of Thailand.

For that political position Dej Snidvongs joined with the first constitutional Cabinet of Siam as People's Committee of Siam of Phraya Manopakorn Nititada government in 1932. Later, in the period of Field Marshal Plaek Phibunsongkhram as Prime Minister in 1938, he held the position of Deputy Minister of Agriculture. Later in 1974 as Deputy Minister of Economic Affairs in Khuang Aphaiwong government. In 1944, he also joined the cabinet by being the Minister of Economic Affairs and joined the government of Khuang Aphaiwong. In 1947, he served as Minister of Economic Affairs for a period and in 1948 he was appointed as Minister to the Office of the Prime Minister.

Important position of Dej Snidvongs is to receive the King Bhumibol Adulyadej appointed as a Privy Councilor on 24 April 1947 and was President of the Privy Council on 18 February 1975 until his death.

Royal decorations
Sanya received the following royal decorations in the Honours System of Thailand:
  Knight Grand Cross of The Most Illustrious Order of Chula Chom Klao
  Knight Grand Cordon of the Most Exalted Order of the White Elephant
  Knight Grand Cordon of The Most Noble Order of the Crown of Thailand
  War Medal of B.E. 2461
  Medal for Service Rendered in the Interior (Indochina)
  King Rama IX Royal Cypher Medal, 1st Class
   Chai Medal
   First Class of Red Cross Medal of Appreciation (gold medal)

Foreign honours
  Grand Crosses of the Order of the Dannebrog (Denmark) - 1958
  Order of Merit of the Federal Republic of Germany (Germany) - 1962
  Grand Decoration of Honour in Gold with Sash for Services to the Republic of Austria (Austria) - 1964

References

1898 births
Dej Snidvongs
Dej Snidvongs
1975 deaths
Grand Crosses with Star and Sash of the Order of Merit of the Federal Republic of Germany
Dej Snidvongs
Dej Snidvongs